Photedes inops, common name Spartina borer moth, is a species of moth native to North America. The larvae are hosted on Spartina pectinata, apparently exclusively. It is listed as a species of special concern in the US state of Connecticut.

References

Hadeninae